The Suzuki Ciaz is a subcompact sedan produced by Suzuki since 2014. It is developed to replace the Suzuki SX4 sedan in several Asian, African and Latin American markets. It went on sale for the first time in India, the largest market for Suzuki in September 2014. , it is the larger model of two sedans produced by Suzuki, the other being the Dzire.

The Ciaz has been rebadged and marketed by Toyota as the Toyota Belta since 2021 for certain African markets.

The "Ciaz" name stands for "Comfort, Intelligence, Attitude and Zeal", or "City from A to Z".

Overview 
The Ciaz was previewed as the Suzuki Ciaz Concept in 2014 Auto Expo India. It was also revealed in the Beijing Motor Show in April 2014 as the Suzuki Alivio, in a near-production guise. Launched in September 2014, the Suzuki Ciaz is one of the largest car in the segment with 4,490 mm in length, 1,730 mm in width, 1,485 mm in height. The car sits on a 2,650 mm wheelbase which is said to be C-segment territory, although Suzuki positioned the Ciaz against the B-segment sedans in most markets. The boot space of 510-litres and it is claimed to be the largest in its class.

Markets

India 
In India, the Ciaz replaced the SX4 sedan which was marketed in the country simply as the Maruti Suzuki SX4. Released to the market in October 2014, the Ciaz belongs to the B-segment sedan market which is commonly referred as the "mid-size sedan" category in the country, above the Indian "compact sedan" segment which is typically less than 4 meter in length. Maruti Suzuki was targeting the Ciaz as the market leader in the category while also attempting to expand the segment sales volume.

Maruti Suzuki claimed it has tweaked the ECU and mapped throttle response differently for the petrol Ciaz for better performance and efficiency. The petrol engine is available with 4-speed automatic and 5-speed manual, while the diesel one is available only in 5-speed manual.

In September 2015, the mild-hybrid version of the diesel Ciaz was launched. Marketed as the SHVS (Smart Hybrid Vehicle by Suzuki), the fuel economy is improved by employing an ISG (integrated starter generator) that offers engine power assistance using the motor. The ISG also provides assistance to the engine start-stop technology that automatically stops the engine during traffic light, and starts when the clutch is released.

Since April 2017, Maruti Suzuki moved the Ciaz sales and distribution from the regular Arena dealerships to Nexa dealerships, a network of dealership outlets for Maruti Suzuki high-end models. Since its inception in 2015, the dealership network previously only offered the S-Cross and Baleno.

The Ciaz has sold over 270,000 units in India since its launch up to September 2019. The top-end Alpha trim contributes to more than 54 percent of the total sales for the sedan, while the Nexa Blue colour was picked by over 30 percent of Ciaz customers.

Facelift 
In August 2018, the Ciaz received its first facelift. This diesel engine is short-lived as it was discontinued in February 2020 due to the implementation of Bharat Stage 6 emission standards.

Thailand 

The Ciaz was launched in Thailand in July 2015. Manufactured in the Rayong facility, it is equipped with a K12B 1.2-litre engine with  paired with a CVT automatic transmission to conform with the Eco Car regulation that promises tax breaks for economical cars. Suzuki claimed the Ciaz could achieve  and CO2 levels less than 120 g/km. The Rayong plant also produced the Ciaz with the K14B 1.4-litre for exports.

The facelifted version was launched to the market in March 2020.

China 
The car was launched to the market in January 2015 as the Suzuki Alivio with the Chinese name being Qiyue (启悦). The Alivio also comes with an optional electric sunroof. The facelifted version was unveiled in October 2017, with a unique styling that is not applied to the global version of the Ciaz.

Following Suzuki's departure from the Chinese market and the sale of Changan Suzuki to Changan, the Alivio was relaunched in 2022 as the Oshan Qiyue under the Oshan brand, with the Chinese name Qiyue (启悦) emblems now replacing the previous Alivio emblem and styling reverted to the pre-facelift version of the Alivio.

Indonesia 
In Indonesia, the Ciaz was introduced in November 2015 and imported from Thailand. It was only available in GLX trim, powered with a 1.4-litre K14B petrol engine, and paired with either 5-speed manual or 4-speed automatic transmissions.

Due to poor sales, Suzuki stopped sending Ciaz to dealers since December 2017. But the sales continued with special order scheme until mid-2018. Only around 200 units were sold in the country.

Singapore 
In January 2016, Suzuki launches the Ciaz in Singapore and was sold there as the Ciaz RS.

Philippines 
In the Philippines, the Ciaz was launched on 13 April 2016. It was initially offered in 3 variants; GL M/T, GL A/T and GLX A/T, all offered with the 1.4-litre K14B engine paired with either 5-speed manual transmission (GL only) or 4-speed automatic transmission (GL and GLX).

The facelifted Ciaz was launched on 9 July 2021. It only comes in the solo 1.4 GL trim with 4-speed automatic transmission.

In March 2022, the Ciaz was discontinued, leaving the Dzire as the only sedan offering in the Suzuki Philippines lineup.

Toyota Belta 
The Indian-made Ciaz has been sold under Toyota badge as the Toyota Belta in African countries such as Egypt since November 2021. The "Belta" nameplate was previously used for the Japanese domestic market XP90 Toyota Yaris sedan/Vios. It serves as an entry-level sedan model positioned below the Toyota Corolla.

References

External links 

 

Ciaz
Cars introduced in 2014
2020s cars
Subcompact cars
Sedans
Front-wheel-drive vehicles
Vehicles with CVT transmission